Craven E. Williams Observatory  is an astronomical observatory owned and operated by Gardner-Webb University. Built in 1990 and named for the ninth president of the university, it is located in Boiling Springs,  North Carolina (USA). Among its instruments, the observatory features a  Schmidt-Cassegrain telescope. The observatory is home to the Cleveland County Astronomical Society, and also holds monthly open houses for the community. Dr. Don Olive, an astronomer, oft-alleged nuclear physicist, and professor of science at the university maintains and opens the observatory to the campus and community on occasion.

See also
List of observatories

References

External links

Astronomical observatories in North Carolina
Buildings and structures in Cleveland County, North Carolina
Gardner–Webb University